Charles Kent (18 June 1853 – 21 May 1923) was a British-American stage actor and  silent film actor and director.  He appeared in more than 140 films between 1908 and 1923.  He also directed 36 films between 1908 and 1913.

Personal life 
Kent was born on 18 June 1953 in London to Frederick Kent, an Englishman, and Martha Kent, a French woman, in 1853. He came to the United States in 1875 at the age of 23, and died on May 21st, 1923 after a long-lasting illness, and was buried in Evergreen Cemetery.

Career
Kent was "a veteran stage actor" before he began working in films having been on stage for 50 years. He began working with Vitagraph Studios in 1908.

Death
Kent died on May 21, 1923, in a hospital in Brooklyn, aged 69.

Partial filmography

 Antony and Cleopatra (1908)
 Macbeth (1908)
 The Life of Moses (1909)
 A Midsummer Night's Dream (1909)
 Twelfth Night (1910)
 Jean the Match-Maker (1910)
 A Tale of Two Cities (1911)
 A Reformed Santa Claus (1911)
 As You Like It (1912)
 The Doctor's Secret (1913)
 A Florida Enchantment (1914)
 The Strange Story of Sylvia Gray (1914)
 Hearts and the Highway (1915)
 The Battle Cry of Peace (1915)
 The Tarantula (1916)
 The Chattel (1916)
 The Scarlet Runner (1916)
 The Blue Envelope Mystery (1916)
 The Enemy (1916)
 Kennedy Square (1916)
 Whom the Gods Destroy (1916)
 The Marriage Speculation (1917)
 The Money Mill (1917)
 Wild Primrose (1918)
 Tangled Lives (1918)
 Thin Ice (1919)
 Counterfeit (1919)
The Birth of a Soul (1920)
 Man and His Woman (1920)
 The Forbidden Valley (1920)
 Human Collateral (1920)
 The Single Track (1921)
 The Charming Deceiver (1921)
 Rainbow (1921)
 The Prodigal Judge (1922)
 The Leopardess (1923)
 The Ragged Edge (1923)
 The Purple Highway (1923)

References

External links

1852 births
1923 deaths
American male film actors
American male silent film actors
American film directors
British emigrants to the United States
20th-century American male actors